The ISPS Handa Senior World Championship presented by Mission Hills China was a men's senior (over 50) professional golf tournament on the European Senior Tour. It was held just once, in March 2011, at the Mission Hills Golf Club, north of Shenzhen, China. The winner was Sandy Lyle who won the first prize of $52,500 out of total prize-money of $350,000. The tournament was co-sanctioned by Chinese Golf Association.

Winners

External links
Coverage on the European Senior Tour's official site

Former European Senior Tour events
Golf tournaments in China
Recurring sporting events established in 2011
Recurring sporting events disestablished in 2011